Ambición may refer to:

 Ambition (1939 film), a 1939 Argentine film
 Ambición (TV series), a 1980 Mexican telenovela